Football Club Naftovyk Okhtyrka is a Ukrainian amateur football club based in Okhtyrka, Sumy Oblast, where it was founded in 1980. The name of the club means "oiler" in Ukrainian. Ukrnafta company owned the club between 2004 and 2018. The club was dissolved in July 2018, but refounded again in 2020.

History
Naftovyk Okhtyrka was created as a team of the Oil and Gaz administration "Okhtyrkanaftogaz" (today part of Ukrnafta) in 1980.

Naftovyk Okhtyrka took part in the first Ukrainian Premier League season in 1992, after being initially chosen to participate for being the Ukrainian SSR Champion in 1991 (Note: republican level championships were part of Soviet Second League B). Naftovyk Okhtyrka took 8th place in its group that season and was demoted to the Persha Liha as a result. Since 2004 the club has been called FC Naftovyk-Ukrnafta Okhtyrka due to sponsorship from Ukrnafta. The club's crest carries the Okhtyrka city coat of arms. During the 2007–08 season, FC Naftovyk-Ukrnafta Okhtyrka finished 15th in the Ukrainian Premier League and was relegated back to Persha Liha and will play there during the 2008–09 season.

Football kits and sponsors

Stadium

Its home stadium, Naftovyk, has a capacity of 10,500. Also it plays its home games in Sumy at the stadium, Yuvileinyi (Jubilee), that used to belong to Spartak as its home ground does not meet the required criteria for the Premier League and the European competitions. The club is planning to upgrade its stadium in the near future.

Current squad

Honors
Ukrainian Cup
Runners up (1): 1990
Republican championship
Winners (1): 1991
Ukrainian First League
Winner (1): 2006–07

League and cup history
{|class="wikitable"
|-bgcolor="#efefef"
! Season
! Div.
! Pos.
! Pl.
! W
! D
! L
! GS
! GA
! P
!Domestic Cup
!colspan=2|Europe
!Notes
|-
|align=center|1992
|align=center|1st
|align=center|12
|align=center|18
|align=center|5
|align=center|3
|align=center|10
|align=center|12
|align=center|28
|align=center|13
|align=center| finals
|align=center|
|align=center|
|align=center bgcolor=red|Relegated
|-bgcolor=LightCyan
|align=center|1992–93
|align=center|2nd
|align=center bgcolor=tan|3
|align=center|42
|align=center|22
|align=center|10
|align=center|10
|align=center|73
|align=center|41
|align=center|54
|align=center| finals
|align=center|
|align=center|
|align=center|
|-bgcolor=LightCyan
|align=center|1993–94
|align=center|2nd
|align=center|5
|align=center|38
|align=center|19
|align=center|10
|align=center|9
|align=center|57
|align=center|28
|align=center|48
|align=center| finals
|align=center|
|align=center|
|align=center|
|-bgcolor=LightCyan
|align=center|1994–95
|align=center|2nd
|align=center|5
|align=center|42
|align=center|23
|align=center|3
|align=center|16
|align=center|69
|align=center|51
|align=center|72
|align=center| finals
|align=center|
|align=center|
|align=center|
|-bgcolor=LightCyan
|align=center|1995–96
|align=center|2nd
|align=center|8
|align=center|42
|align=center|18
|align=center|12
|align=center|12
|align=center|52
|align=center|37
|align=center|66
|align=center| finals
|align=center|
|align=center|
|align=center|
|-bgcolor=LightCyan
|align=center|1996–97
|align=center|2nd
|align=center|5
|align=center|46
|align=center|25
|align=center|6
|align=center|15
|align=center|76
|align=center|43
|align=center|81
|align=center| Second stage
|align=center|
|align=center|
|align=center|
|-bgcolor=LightCyan
|align=center|1997–98
|align=center|2nd
|align=center|8
|align=center|42
|align=center|19
|align=center|10
|align=center|13
|align=center|56
|align=center|50
|align=center|67
|align=center| finals
|align=center|
|align=center|
|align=center|
|-bgcolor=LightCyan
|align=center|1998–99
|align=center|2nd
|align=center|8
|align=center|38
|align=center|16
|align=center|9
|align=center|13
|align=center|45
|align=center|40
|align=center|57
|align=center| finals
|align=center|
|align=center|
|align=center|
|-bgcolor=LightCyan
|align=center|1999-00
|align=center|2nd
|align=center|14
|align=center|34
|align=center|13
|align=center|5
|align=center|16
|align=center|42
|align=center|51
|align=center|44
|align=center| finals
|align=center|
|align=center|
|align=center bgcolor=red|Relegated
|-bgcolor=PowderBlue
|align=center|2000–01
|align=center|3rd "C"
|align=center bgcolor=gold|1
|align=center|30
|align=center|24
|align=center|3
|align=center|3
|align=center|65
|align=center|20
|align=center|75
|align=center|Did not enter
|align=center|
|align=center|
|align=center bgcolor=lightgreen|Promoted
|-bgcolor=LightCyan
|align=center|2001–02
|align=center|2nd
|align=center|7
|align=center|34
|align=center|13
|align=center|10
|align=center|11
|align=center|35
|align=center|32
|align=center|49
|align=center| finals
|align=center|
|align=center|
|align=center|
|-bgcolor=LightCyan
|align=center|2002–03
|align=center|2nd
|align=center|4
|align=center|34
|align=center|15
|align=center|9
|align=center|10
|align=center|37
|align=center|26
|align=center|54
|align=center| finals
|align=center|
|align=center|
|align=center|
|-bgcolor=LightCyan
|align=center|2003–04
|align=center|2nd
|align=center bgcolor=tan|3
|align=center|34
|align=center|17
|align=center|11
|align=center|6
|align=center|52
|align=center|33
|align=center|62
|align=center| finals
|align=center|
|align=center|
|align=center|
|-bgcolor=LightCyan
|align=center|2004–05
|align=center|2nd
|align=center|10
|align=center|34
|align=center|13
|align=center|10
|align=center|11
|align=center|37
|align=center|26
|align=center|49
|align=center| finals
|align=center|
|align=center|
|align=center|
|-bgcolor=LightCyan
|align=center|2005–06
|align=center|2nd
|align=center|4
|align=center|34
|align=center|17
|align=center|7
|align=center|10
|align=center|50
|align=center|35
|align=center|58
|align=center| finals
|align=center|
|align=center|
|align=center|
|-bgcolor=LightCyan
|align=center|2006–07
|align=center|2nd
|align=center bgcolor=gold|1
|align=center|36
|align=center|27
|align=center|2
|align=center|7
|align=center|58
|align=center|29
|align=center|83
|align=center| finals
|align=center|
|align=center|
|align=center bgcolor=lightgreen|Promoted
|-
|align=center|2007–08
|align=center|1st
|align=center|15
|align=center|30
|align=center|6
|align=center|8
|align=center|16
|align=center|28
|align=center|38
|align=center|26
|align=center| finals
|align=center|
|align=center|
|align=center bgcolor=red|Relegated
|-bgcolor=LightCyan
|align=center|2008–09
|align=center|2nd
|align=center|12
|align=center|32
|align=center|11
|align=center|11
|align=center|10
|align=center|41
|align=center|42
|align=center|41
|align=center| finals
|align=center|
|align=center|
|align=center|–3
|-bgcolor=LightCyan
|align=center|2009–10
|align=center|2nd
|align=center|7
|align=center|34
|align=center|17
|align=center|6
|align=center|11
|align=center|45
|align=center|37
|align=center|57
|align=center| finals
|align=center|
|align=center|
|align=center|
|-bgcolor=LightCyan
|align=center|2010–11
|align=center|2nd
|align=center|14
|align=center|34
|align=center|10
|align=center|11
|align=center|13
|align=center|40
|align=center|44
|align=center|41
|align=center| finals
|align=center|
|align=center|
|align=center|
|-bgcolor=LightCyan
|align=center|2011–12
|align=center|2nd
|align=center|10
|align=center|34
|align=center|12
|align=center|8
|align=center|14
|align=center|49
|align=center|43
|align=center|44
|align=center| finals
|align=center|
|align=center|
|align=center|
|-bgcolor=LightCyan
|align=center|2012–13
|align=center|2nd
|align=center|5
|align=center|34
|align=center|15
|align=center|9
|align=center|10
|align=center|39
|align=center|31
|align=center|54
|align=center| finals
|align=center|
|align=center|
|align=center|
|-bgcolor=LightCyan
|align=center|2013–14
|align=center|2nd
|align=center|7
|align=center|30
|align=center|12
|align=center|7
|align=center|11
|align=center|40
|align=center|35
|align=center|43
|align=center| finals
|align=center|
|align=center|
|align=center|
|-bgcolor=LightCyan
|align=center|2014–15
|align=center|2nd
|align=center|12
|align=center|30
|align=center|10
|align=center|10
|align=center|10
|align=center|32
|align=center|34
|align=center|40
|align=center| finals
|align=center|
|align=center|
|align=center|
|-bgcolor=LightCyan
|align=center|2015–16
|align=center|2nd
|align=center|9
|align=center|30
|align=center|11
|align=center|7
|align=center|12
|align=center|31
|align=center|33
|align=center|40
|align=center| finals
|align=center|
|align=center|
|align=center|
|-bgcolor=LightCyan
|align=center|2016–17
|align=center|2nd
|align=center|6
|align=center|34 	
|align=center|15 	
|align=center|9 	
|align=center|10 	
|align=center|47 	
|align=center|29 	
|align=center|54
|align=center| finals
|align=center|
|align=center|
|align=center|
|-bgcolor=LightCyan
|align=center|2017–18
|align=center|2nd
|align=center|15
|align=center|34
|align=center|8
|align=center|9
|align=center|17
|align=center|27
|align=center|42
|align=center|33
|align=center| finals
|align=center|
|align=center|
|align=center bgcolor=red|Relegated and withdraw
|}

Head coaches

 Serhiy Shevchenko (2001–2007)
 Valeriy Horodov (2007 – 5 Aug 2009)
 Serhiy Shevchenko (5 Aug 2009 – 27 Jun 2010)
 Serhiy Mizin (27 Jun 2010 – 2011)

See also
 FC Fakel Varva
 FC Trostianets

Notes and references

External links
 Official site 

 
Association football clubs established in 1980
1980 establishments in Ukraine
Football clubs in the Ukrainian Soviet Socialist Republic
Amateur football clubs in Ukraine
Football clubs in Sumy Oblast
Sport in Okhtyrka
Ukrnafta